The Boat Race is a 2009 drama film directed by Bernard Bellefroid.

Plot synopsis
Alexandre is a 15-year-old boy who lives alone with his father, enduring relentless physical violence. To escape from his daily life, Alex rows on the Meuse, and has only one obsession: to win the Singles event at the Belgian Championships. At the rowing club, coach Sergi teams Alex with Pablo, despite their initial dislike for each other, and they win the Doubles event at the Belgian championships.

Cast
 Joffrey Verbruggen : Alexandre
 Thierry Hancisse : Thierry
 Sergi López : Sergi
 Pénélope Lévêque : Murielle
 David Murgia : Pablo
 Hervé Sogne : Franco
 Stéphanie Blanchoud : Laetitia
 Jean-François Wolff : Jean

Reception
The film received four nominations at the 1st Magritte Awards and won Most Promising Actor for Joffrey Verbruggen.

References

External links

2009 films
2009 drama films
Belgian drama films
French drama films
2000s French-language films
Luxembourgian drama films
French-language Belgian films
French-language Luxembourgian films
2000s French films